St Giles' Church, Camberwell, is the parish church of Camberwell, a district of London which forms part of the London Borough of Southwark. It is part of Camberwell Deanery within the Anglican Diocese of Southwark in the Church of England. The church is dedicated to Saint Giles, the patron saint of the disabled. A local legend associates the dedication of St Giles with a well near Camberwell Grove, which may also have given Camber-well its name. An article on the church from 1827 states: "it has been conjectured that the well might have been famous for some medicinal virtues and might have occasioned the dedication of the church to this patron saint of cripples."

History 

The ancient parish stretched from Boundary Lane, just north of the present Albany Road, south as far as Sydenham Hill. The Anglo-Saxon church on the site of St Giles', and recorded in the Domesday Book, was almost certainly built of wood and stood amongst fields and woodland. The church was later rebuilt in stone by William FitzRobert, Earl of Gloucester and Lord of the Manor of Camberwell. Numerous alterations and extensions took place over the next three hundred years and by the 18th century, the church was crammed with box pews.

On 7 February 1841 a devastating fire, caused by a faulty heating system and fuelled by the wooden pews and galleries virtually destroyed the medieval church. The heat was so great that stained glass melted and stone crumbled to powder. Immediately after the fire, a competition to choose the architect for the new church produced 53 designs and was won by the firm of Scott and Moffat. St Giles' was the first major Gothic building by George Gilbert Scott, best known as architect of St Pancras Station and the Albert Memorial.

The new church was consecrated on 21 November 1844 by the diocesan Bishop of Winchester. The church was built to a cruciform shape with a central tower surmounted by an octagonal spire of 210 feet (64 m). Much of the facing stone was imported from Caen in Normandy, but by the 1870s the majority of this stone was removed due to decay caused by pollution. Appreciating his mistake, Scott paid for the church to be refaced with Portland stone which was more suitable for the London atmosphere.

The church suffered considerably in the Second World War with many of the stained-glass windows being destroyed. Just over 100 years after the re-facing, stone began to fall from the spire and major vertical cracks threatened its structural integrity. In June 2000, the top 72 feet (22 m) of the spire was taken down and rebuilt at a cost of £1,000,000.

Architecture and interior
St Giles' Church is laid out in a cruciform plan and has gabled transepts. The nave has a clerestory and lower aisles with five bays and gabled entrance porches. The interior has an arch-braced roof and a lierne vault at the crossing. The nave is flanked by alternately round and octagonal columns with foliated capitals. The south transept is used as the Lady Chapel and the north transept holds the organ.

The 19th-century church features a sedilla and piscina on the south side of the Lady Chapel which date from the 14th century, both remnants of the mediaeval church. Further remains of the old church are visible in the former vicarage garden on Benhill Road, where a mediaeval porch stands.  This originally housed the sedilla piscina which were moved into the rebuilt church in 1916; the mediaeval porch is today used to house bins for the local youth club.

Beneath the present church lies the 300-year-old crypt. The original graves and tombs were removed and the various rooms were refurbished to house 'The Camberwell Samaritans'. The crypt was opened in its new role by Queen Elizabeth, The Queen Mother in February, 1962. The Samaritans provided emergency relief and support for the large number of local homeless men in the area. The Camberwell Samaritans later became the St Giles Trust which continues to operate in Camberwell Church Street, a few minutes walk away from the church. The crypt itself is now used as an arts venue and jazz club.

St Giles' Church also contains notable stained-glass windows. In the chancel is a window by Lavers & Barraud. The windows in the transepts designed by William Morris were destroyed in wartime bombing, and have been replaced by glass designed by Ninian Comper. The large East Window was designed by the local art historian and supporter of the Pre-Raphaelite art movement, John Ruskin, a resident of Camberwell, and Oldfield. It depicts a wide range of Biblical scenes, from the Creation to the End of Time, in stained glass. Ruskin visited a number of mediaeval French cathedrals such as Chartres to gain inspiration for his stained glass designs for St Giles'. The glass was made by the English stained glass company Ward and Nixon.

The West window is also a Ward & Nixon and incorporates some 13th century pieces of glass.
  On the North side is a plaque commemorating Charles Masterman (1873–1927), instigator of the National Health Insurance system (the precursor of the NHS) and his family.

Organ 

The organ at St Giles' is a historically significant instrument, designed by Samuel Sebastian Wesley. Before embarking on his career as a cathedral organist and composer, Wesley, one of Samuel Wesley's seven children, was organist for several years in the old church of St Giles'. After the 1841 fire, Wesley returned to St Giles' to design the new organ in 1844 and played it at the opening recital.

The three-manual organ was constructed by James Chapman Bishop, a British organ builder founded in 1807 which as Bishop & Son remains one of the oldest and last surviving organ builders in the country. Bishop & Sons continues to service and maintain the St Giles' organ to this day.  The organ underwent restoration in 1890 and again in 1960. Although it has undergone some adaptations, it retains its original mechanical 'tracker' action, albeit operated electro-pneumatically since the 1960 work.

2015 restoration 

In 2015, St Giles' Church embarked upon a major appeal to raise £500,000 in order to overhaul and restore the organ. Much of the 1960s electrical system is beyond repair and the organ's pipes require significant restoration. Spearheading the fundraising campaign will be a world record attempt by the Director of Music and organist at St Giles', Ashley Valentine, who attempted to set the world record for the "longest marathon church organ playing" in June 2015.

Church bells 

St Giles' has a ring of ten bells cast in 1844 by the firm of Mears at the famous Whitechapel Bell Foundry. The largest, the Tenor, weights 1 ton and 4 cwts (1,220 kilograms).

Worship 
St Giles' is in the Catholic tradition of the Church of England. There are two services on Sundays, a said service at 8:00 am and a sung Parish Mass at 10:00 am. There are further said services throughout the week.

References

External links 

 St Giles' Church website
 Music events at St Giles' website
 Camberwell St Giles Church of England listing
 Bishop & Son, organ builder
 Guinness World Record organ marathon page

Camberwell
Rebuilt churches in the United Kingdom
19th-century Church of England church buildings
George Gilbert Scott buildings
Gothic Revival church buildings in London
Grade II* listed churches in London
Grade II* listed buildings in the London Borough of Southwark
Churches completed in 1844
Camberwell
Camberwell
Camberwell
Camberwell